Nagybajom is a town in Somogy County, Hungary.

History
According to László Szita the settlement was completely Hungarian in the 18th century.

Notable residents

 Benedek Virág (1752 or 1754 – 1830), Hungarian teacher, poet, translator
 Ádám Pálóczi Horváth (1760 – 1820), Hungarian poet, author
 Péter Boross (born 1928), Hungarian politician, Prime Minister of Hungary (1993 - 1994)
 Paul Tenczer, Jewish editor and activist (1836-1905)

External links 
 Street map

References

Populated places in Somogy County
History of Somogy